Vinogradovsky (masculine), Vinogradovskaya (feminine), or Vinogradovskoye (neuter) may refer to:
Vinogradovsky District, a district of Arkhangelsk Oblast, Russia
Vinogradovsky (rural locality), a rural locality (a khutor) in Rostov Oblast, Russia